Some prisons in Romania formerly housed political prisoners, both during successive dictatorships of 1938–1944 and during the subsequent Communist regime.  there are 45 prisons under the control of the Ministry of Justice, housing about 27,600 prisoners.

References

Prisons in Romania
Romania
Prisons